Fall; or, Dodge in Hell is a 2019 speculative fiction novel by American author Neal Stephenson. The book explores mind-uploading to the Cloud, from the perspective of Richard "Dodge" Forthrast, a character introduced in Stephenson's 2011 Reamde.

Plot summary

Billionaire Richard "Dodge" Forthrast is declared brain-dead after a routine medical procedure. Friends and family find his last will directs that his body be cryonically preserved for the purpose of future brain scanning and eventual revival. His wishes are fulfilled, his frozen brain destructively scanned, and his connectome saved in digital form.

Several years pass in which portable augmented reality viewers become ubiquitous, social media echo chambers cause rural lawlessness, commercial quantum computing is feasible, and anonymous distributed ledger identification becomes popular in business.

Dodge's grandniece Sophia animates Dodge's connectome as an experiment on secure distributed computing, for her senior thesis, at Princeton. The connectome remembers nearly nothing, but calling itself "Egdod" -- perhaps to associate himself with Dodge -- builds a virtual world, with physical laws similar to what little it does "remember". Wealthy anonymous donors initially fund the support  datacenters running this "world". Brain scanning gains general popularity, after traffic analysis shows that virtual minds are achieving an afterlife, in a medieval fantasy setting.  All the downloaded minds, however, suffer extreme amnesia.

Egdod is usurped by El -- a terminally ill, and mentally ill, billionaire, who is funding the computing process. El believes that Dodge not only lacked imagination when constructing the virtual world, but that he also consumes a disproportionate amount of computing power. El conquers the world, isolates Dodge (with the power of his mind, aided by augmention by his private data centers). El subjugates the (virtual) population with a religion centered upon worship of him. Sophia (after being murdered by El) enters this virtual world, to assist Dodge in disrupting El's power. She -- and several other characters -- embark on an epic quest.  Stephenson, in narrating this, is able to describe many aspects of this medieval fantasy world, and of the beliefs that El has instilled amongst its peoples. In the end Dodge and El have one final confrontation to determine whose vision for this virtual world prevails.

Philosophical and scientific content and influences

When attempting to explain why the virtual world created by connectomes of brain scans resembles the physical world so much, character Corvallis Kawasaki cites a claim by philosopher Immanuel Kant that the human mind cannot make sense of anything without a space-time lattice.

Stephenson indicates Fall is indebted to David Deutsch's The Fabric of Reality, as well as John Milton's Paradise Lost.

Fall and Reamde are set in the same fictional universe as Cryptonomicon and The Baroque Cycle. Fall refers to the historical figures of Lawrence Waterhouse and Rudolf von Hacklheber from Cryptonomicon, and Enoch Root makes an appearance in the story.

References

Further reading
 

2019 American novels
American science fiction novels
Cryonics in fiction
Novels by Neal Stephenson
Transhumanist books
William Morrow and Company books